A recessional hymn is a hymn placed at the end of a church service to close it. It is used commonly in the Catholic Church and Anglican Church, an equivalent to the concluding voluntary, which is called a Recessional Voluntary, for example a Wedding Recessional.

See also
Processional hymn

References

External links

Hymnology
Order of Mass